The Chakwars are a clan of Bhardwaj gotra of Bhumihar Brahman (Babhan) caste and is mainly concentrated on the both Side of the Banks of river Ganga from Begusarai to Manihari block of Katihar district.
They were King of Anga Region and were Known as Angarai among local people. Nayagaon and Samho village of Begusarai were the capital of Chakwars. Samho and Nayagaon splitted in two parts by river ganga. Now Samho is a very big village cum block in Begusarai district of Bihar, India. They are descendant of Great Chirayu Mishra as per their oral history and also published by Dr KK Dutta, a renowned historian. He came from somewhere in North Bihar Most probably Madhubani district of North Bihar or Saptari district of Nepal and settled down in the area between pargana chhai (Old north Bhagalpur region & Western Part of Purnea division]] and Saraisa Region(Samastipur-Begusarai)of North Bihar.
Chakwar Bhumihars are considered to be a Powerful clan and Fine Military Race and they fought on behalf of the Bettiah Raj with the East India company, British army, Bengal nawabs and the Nepalese army, during the expeditions of nepaul, Chakwars Bhumihar also helped and fought against British and Mughals on behalf of Fateh Bahadur Sahi from gopalganj Gorakhour region Who declared First war against the British and gave a lot of military help to the sanyasis of Bihar and Uttar Pradesh who were going to fight in Bengal During Sannyasi Rebellion .

Chakwars launched many Military Raid in the region between South Bihar and Nepal terais They participated in the Many guerrilla war In Gangetic valley to terai forest against the British, Nawabs and the Mughals . In the Bhagalpur Hill Rangers that the British had created, some chakwars of the Bihpur area are also recruited, the Chakwar bhumihars people of Sonbarsa village of Thana Bihpur also fought an armed struggle against the British Planter Sir Grant, in which they killed 7 soldiers and wounded many of Gorkha battalion. The nominated members of Bhumihar Brahmin Mahasabha, Shri jaleshwar prasad kunwar, resident of Dhruvganj village of Kharik Block, also belongs to this chakwar Bhumihar, who emphasized on the economic, social, and educational structure of the landlords. Chakwar bhumiahr also played a very important role in the Quit India Movement of 1942 under the leadership of siyaram singh a Bhumihar Farmer from Tilakpur village-Sultanganj(Bhagalpur district) He was established a Armed guerilla gang Named Siyaram Dal(Group) and established a parallel government from Bhagalpur district to the Terai of Nepal.

They were also involved in anti- communist massacres in Begusarai in 1960s and 1970s .
Kamdeo singh, a famous gangster, smuggler and mafia strongman from Begusarai district of Bihar, India. He was also from chakwar clan of Bhardwaj gotra. He was an anti-communist and for the locals of his hometown, he has been called a "Robin Hood" and "God". Kamdev Singh was hired by various politicians for booth capturing. He was also from Nayagaon village of Begusarai which was considered as the fort for chakwars( including samho)

They also sent help to Jayaprakash Narayan's Azad dasta, the leader of movement Siyaram singh and nityadhari jee belongs to the same bhumihar community Sultanganj(Bhagalpur) and Khagaria of Munger district. In the 18th century, they became amassed military power and controlled large swathes of South Bihar.[1]

History
According to Muslim and British sources, the territory of the Chakwar kingdom extended from Rajmahal in the east and Darbhanga in the north. The Chakwars began to grow in strength following the disintegration of the Mughal Empire and they asserted independence by issuing land grants with their own signatures and seals. These were issued by various Chakwar kings including Raja Bakhtawar Singh who ruled between 1718 and 1727. The strength of the Chakwars stemmed from the fact that they controlled various important river-routes across the Ganges and was able to extort a large amount of money from European traders. They also carried out raids on neighbouring regions.
European sources from 1719 to 1721 note that skirmishes between Europeans and the Chakwars were common and many traders requested increased protection from Chakwar attacks.

In 1720, Nasrat Khan was appointed the governor of Bihar however he was unable to subdue the Chakwars.

References

Brahmins
Begusarai
Mithila
Bhumihar clans